born  in Kimitsu, Chiba, Japan is a Japanese actor known for playing the hero Keisuke Jin in the tokusatsu superhero series Kamen Rider X. On December 18, 2019, he suffered a heart attack from a collapse. He has been recovering.

Filmography

Film
 Anata gonomi no (1969) - Young man A
 Gamera tai Daimaju Jaiga (1970)
 Osanazuma (1970) 
 Five Riders vs. King Dark (1974) - Keisuke Jin / Kamen Rider X
 Utareru mae-ni ute! (1976) - Matsuda Kensaku
 Sengoku jieitai (1979) - Kazumichi Morishita
 Akujo kamakiri (1983) - Takayuki Shimazaki
 Heisei Riders vs. Shōwa Riders: Kamen Rider Taisen feat. Super Sentai (2014) - Keisuke Jin / Kamen Rider X

Television
 Kamen Rider X (1974) - Keisuke Jin / Kamen Rider X
 Kamen Rider Stronger (1975) - Keisuke Jin / Kamen Rider X
 All Together! Seven Kamen Riders!! (1976) - Keisuke Jin / Kamen Rider X
 Kamen Rider (Skyrider) (1979-1980) - Keisuke Jin / Kamen Rider X

External links

References

1949 births
Living people
People from Kimitsu
Actors from Chiba Prefecture
Japanese male actors